Choreutis falsifica is a moth in the family Choreutidae. It was described by Edward Meyrick in 1927. It is found on Samoa.

References

Choreutis
Moths described in 1927